Jesse Joyce (born 17 August 1997) is an Australian rules footballer playing for the Gold Coast Football Club in the Australian Football League (AFL). He was drafted by the Gold Coast Football Club with their sixth selection and sixty-seventh overall in the 2016 rookie draft. He made his debut in the thirty-eight point loss against  in round 11, 2016 at Metricon Stadium.

Early life and junior football
Joyce was born in Melbourne but moved to Tweed Heads on the Queensland-New South Wales border at the age of 2. He first played junior football on the Gold Coast for the Coolangatta Tweed Heads Australian Football Club  before switching to the Palm Beach Currumbin Australian Football Club and making his senior debut at the age of 16. He also attended Palm Beach Currumbin High School in his teenage years and graduated with future Suns teammate Max Spencer.

He joined the Gold Coast Suns' academy at the age of 14 and was drafted to his hometown team with the 67th pick in the 2016 AFL rookie draft.

AFL career
Joyce made his AFL debut for the Gold Coast Suns against the Sydney Swans in round 11 of the 2016 AFL season.

References

External links

 

1997 births
Living people
Gold Coast Football Club players
Southport Australian Football Club players
Australian rules footballers from Queensland
Sportspeople from the Gold Coast, Queensland